The 2013 BRD Timișoara Challenger was a professional tennis tournament played on clay courts. It was the seventh edition of the tournament which was part of the 2013 ATP Challenger Tour. It took place in Timișoara, Romania between 30 June and 9 July 2013.

Singles main draw entrants

Seeds

 1 Rankings are as of June 24, 2013.

Other entrants
The following players received wildcards into the singles main draw:
  Patrick Ciorcilă
  Victor Vlad Cornea
  Petru-Alexandru Luncanu
  Dragoș Cristian Mîrtea

The following player received entry as an alternate into the singles main draw:
  Jaroslav Pospíšil

The following players received entry from the qualifying draw:
  Lorenzo Giustino
  Michael Linzer
  Axel Michon
  Miljan Zekić

Champions

Singles

  Andreas Haider-Maurer def.  Rubén Ramírez Hidalgo 6–4, 3–6, 6–4

Doubles

  Jonathan Eysseric /  Nicolas Renavand def.  Ilija Vučić /  Miljan Zekić 6–7(8–6), 6–2, [10–7]

External links
Official Website

BRD Timisoara Challenger
BRD Timișoara Challenger
2013 in Romanian tennis